Striganoviella vanhillei is a species of ground beetle in the subfamily Scaritinae. It is known to occur in South Africa.

References

vanhillei
Beetles described in 1962